Christmas in South Africa may refer to:

Christmas as it is celebrated in South Africa
"Christmas in South Africa", an episode of the television series Teletubbies

See also
Christmas (disambiguation)
South Africa (disambiguation)